Helensville railway station formerly served the town of Helensville, 40 kilometres northwest of Auckland in the North Island of New Zealand. It was a stop on the North Auckland Line, and was the next major station north of Waitakere. At one time it was called the Helensville North Railway Station.

Though closed in 1987 (reopened from mid-2008 to late 2009), the site still features the original wooden building, which has been restored, and has a shunting yard and KiwiRail Network depot. The platform was modernized in 2007 as part of a trial to reintroduce a commuter train service to Auckland. There is an old steam locomotive (an NZR D class) at the entrance to the platform from the station car park.

Services
The station was closed on 31 July 1967 to passenger traffic, and on 12 June 1987 to all traffic.

In June 2007, it was announced that suburban rail services would be extended to Helensville in 2008 for a trial period. Services to the town resumed on 14 July 2008 after an absence of 28 years and ran until Christmas 2009. The trial services consisted of a Monday–Friday morning service from Helensville to Auckland's Britomart Transport Centre and evening service from Britomart to Helenville before returning to Britomart.

For some years, special train services were put on between Helensville and Auckland for the Farmers Santa Parade every Christmas season.

References 

Rail transport in Auckland
Railway stations opened in 1881
1881 establishments in New Zealand
Railway stations closed in 1987
Defunct railway stations in New Zealand
Buildings and structures in the Auckland Region